Silks and Saddles is a 1929 American pre-Code drama film directed by Robert F. Hill and written by Edward Clark, James Gruen, Paul Gangelin, Faith Thomas, J.G. Hawks and Albert DeMond. The film stars Richard Walling, Marian Nixon, Sam De Grasse, Montagu Love, Mary Nolan and Otis Harlan. The film was released on January 20, 1929, by Universal Pictures.

Cast        
Richard Walling as Johnny Spencer
Marian Nixon as Lucy Calhoun 
Sam De Grasse as William Morrissey
Montagu Love as Walter Sinclair
Mary Nolan as Sybil Morrissey
Otis Harlan as Jimmy McKee
David Torrence as Judge Clifford
Claire McDowell as Mrs. Calhoun
Johnny Fox as Ellis 
Hayden Stevenson as Trainer

References

External links
 

1929 films
1920s English-language films
Silent American drama films
1929 drama films
Universal Pictures films
Films directed by Robert F. Hill
American silent feature films
American black-and-white films
1920s American films